Lafond is a surname, and may refer to;

 Andréanne Lafond (1919 or 1920–2012), French-born Canadian journalist 
 Henri Lafond (1894–1963), French banker and businessman
 Jean-Baptiste Lafond (born 1961), French rugby union player
 Jean-Daniel Lafond (born 1944), Canadian filmmaker
 Mary Ellen Turpel-Lafond (born 1963), Canadian lawyer
 Paul Lafond (1919–1988), Canadian senator
 Philip Lafond (born 1961), Canadian professional wrestler
 R. Gauthier-Lafond, French Olympic sports shooter

See also
 Lafond, Alberta, a hamlet in Alberta, Canada
 Lafon (disambiguation)